The Sidney Kobre Award for Lifetime Achievement in Journalism History is an award for achievement in the study of the history of journalism in the United States, awarded by the American Journalism Historians Association to "individuals with an exemplary record of sustained achievement in journalism history through teaching, research, professional activities, or other contributions to the field of journalism history." The award is not given every year.

Recipients
2022: Janice Hume, University of Georgia
2020: Ford Risley, Pennsylvania State University
2019: Debra van Tuyll, Augusta University
2018: Eugenia M. Palmegiano, St. Peter's University
2017: Kitty Endres, University of Akron
2016: Jean Folkerts, University of North Carolina 
2015: Michael Sweeney, Ohio University
2014: Leonard Teel, Georgia State
2013: David Abrahamson, Northwestern University
2012: David Paul Nord, Indiana University
2010: David A. Copeland, Elon University
2009: Betty Winfield, University of Missouri
2008: Patrick Washburn, Ohio University
2007: Wally Eberhard, University of Georgia
2006: Hazel Dicken-Garcia, University of Minnesota
2005: Barbara Cloud, University of Nevada-Las Vegas
2004: Joseph McKerns, Ohio State University
2003: Michael Murray, University of Missouri-St. Louis
2002: Margaret A. Blanchard, University of North Carolina
2001: James Startt, Valparaiso University
1999: Hiley Ward, Temple University
1998: David Sloan, University of Alabama
1997: Maurine Beasley, University of Maryland
1992: Ed Emery, University of Minnesota
1986: Sidney Kobre, Florida State University and Community College of Baltimore

See also

 List of history awards

References 

American journalism awards
Literary awards honoring lifetime achievement